Andrew McCreight Creery (June 2, 1863 – February 14, 1942) was an Irish-born financial, real estate and insurance agent and political figure in British Columbia. He represented Vancouver City in the Legislative Assembly of British Columbia from 1924 to 1928 as a Provincial Party member.

Biography
He was born in Ardglass, County Down, the son of Andrew Creery and Alice Tate, and was educated at Foyle College in Derry and Trinity College in Dublin. Creery came to Canada in 1888, first settling in Calgary, Alberta. He married Anna Hulbert the following year. In 1890, he moved to Vancouver. Creery was a Grand Master in the Freemasons.

His son Second Lieutenant Ronald Hulbert Creery was killed in France in 1917 during World War I.

Andrew McCreight Creery died in Victoria on February 14, 1942.

References

1863 births
1942 deaths
Politicians from County Down
Irish emigrants to Canada (before 1923)
Members of the Legislative Assembly of British Columbia